The Feel of Neil Diamond is Neil Diamond's debut album, released on Bang Records in the US, London Records in the UK, and Stateside Records in Australia. It includes his first three big hits, "Solitary Man" (#55), "Cherry, Cherry" (#6), and "Oh No No" (#16). Artie Butler was the arranger and conductor; Leonard Linton was the photographer; and Jeff Barry and Ellie Greenwich, continuing to work together although they had divorced the previous year, were the producers.

The photo for this album cover was taken under the Brooklyn Bridge by Neil's first cousin Len Rapoport who was only 17 years old when these iconic photos were taken. The photo credit on this Neil's first album, shows photo by: Leonard Linton which was Rapoport's middle name. He wasn't sure if he should take a "stage" name at that time, but later photo credits reverted to his name Leonard Rapoport. You will find his photo credits on many of the Diamond Program Books, albums and other Diamond publications.

Mr. Rapoport shot this photo when he was just 17 years old and also shot the first iconic photos of Neil at his Massapequa, Long Island home.  All the photos he shot were also developed and printed by Len at that time and the rights to those photos were passed onto Diamond in the early 1990s by Mr. Rapoport.

It has never been released on CD, but the CD The Bang Years includes all the tracks from this album and from Diamond's second album, Just for You.

The Australian issue had two additional tracks- "The Boat that I Row" and "Thank the Lord for the Night Time".

Track listing

Neil Diamond albums
1966 debut albums
Albums produced by Jeff Barry
Albums produced by Ellie Greenwich
Bang Records albums